Vadim Pigas (born 8 August 2001) is a Belarusian professional footballer who plays for Isloch Minsk Raion.

References

External links 
 
 

2001 births
Living people
Belarusian footballers
Association football defenders
FC BATE Borisov players
FC Isloch Minsk Raion players